Kijfhoek can refer to:
Kijfhoek (village) in South Holland
Kijfhoek (classification yard)